Figo House is a Queen Anne style house near Portland State University in Portland, Oregon. The house was purchased by Portland attorney Randal Acker in 2005 as office space for his small legal practice. Acker named the house after his dog, Figo, who was named after former Portuguese soccer star Luís Figo.

In 2006, TriMet, Portland's mass transit authority, attempted to acquire the house through condemnation and then sell the property to the university for use as high-rise student housing. The TriMet plan was cancelled in 2008 after Acker successfully argued that eminent domain power is limited.

In 2011, Acker likened his situation to that featured in the Disney movie, Up. Later that year he arranged a Portland screening of the documentary film, Battle for Brooklyn, about Brooklyn, New York, residents fighting to save their homes from real estate developers.

See also
Edith Macefield
Nail house
Vera Coking
Wu Ping
Michael Forbes (farmer)

References

Houses in Portland, Oregon
1894 establishments in Oregon
Real estate holdout